Al-Tamanah (sometimes spelled al-Taman'ah, al-Tamana’a or al-Teman’a) is a town in northwestern Syria, administratively a part of the Maarrat al-Nu'man District of the Idlib Governorate. According to the Syria Central Bureau of Statistics, al-Tamanah had a population of 7,382 in the 2004 census.

References

Populated places in Maarat al-Numan District